The 2022 Big Sky Conference women's soccer tournament was the postseason women's soccer tournament for the Big Sky Conference held from November 2 to November 6, 2022. The five-match tournament took place at Jackson Stadium, home of the Northern Colorado Bears. The six-team single-elimination tournament consisted of three rounds based on seeding from regular season conference play. The Montana Grizzlies were the defending champions.  Montana was unable to defend their title as they lost to Idaho in the Semifinals.  Northern Arizona won their first title since 2014 by defeating Idaho in the final on penalties 4–3 after the game finished tied 0–0.  This was the fourth overall title for Montana, and the first title for head coach Alan Berrios. As tournament champions, Northern Arizona earned the Big Sky's automatic berth into the 2022 NCAA Division I women's soccer tournament.

Seeding 
The top six teams in the regular season earned a spot in the tournament.  No tiebreakers were required as each team finished with a unique regular season conference record.

Bracket

Source:

Schedule

First Round

Semifinals

Final

Statistics

Goalscorers

All Tournament Team

Source:

MVP in bold

References 

Big Sky Conference Women's Soccer Tournament
2022 Big Sky Conference women's soccer season